The Borșa is a left tributary of the river Someșul Mic in Romania. It discharges into the Someșul Mic in Răscruci.

The following rivers are tributaries to the river Borșa:
Left: Valea Rece, Fundături, Chidea, Bădești
Right: Cristorel, Șoimeni, Făureni, Giula

References

Rivers of Romania
Rivers of Cluj County